Terence Rannowane is a Botswana judge who has served as the Chief Justice of Botswana since 2018.

Career 
Rannowane obtained a Bachelor of Laws from the University of Botswana in 1990, and he obtained a Master of Laws from the University of Warwick in 2003. He began his career as a Magistrate Grade II in 1990. He was appointed Chairman of the Botswana National Parole Board in 2004 and held the position until 2018. He became a Regional Magistrate in 2005. He was appointed to the High Court of Botswana in 2008. In 2012, Rannowane chaired the National Delimitation Commission to draw the parliamentary constituencies of Botswana. In 2018, President Mokgweetsi Masisi appointed Rannowane as the Chief Justice of Botswana.

References 

Living people
Botswana judges
Year of birth missing (living people)